EEM may refer to

 Eem, a river in the central Netherlands
 EEM (psychedelic), a drug
 EEM syndrome
 Embedded event manager
 Employee experience management
 Energy efficient mortgage
 Entesa de l'Esquerra de Menorca